The Roller Girls (on-screen title: Rollergirls) is an American sitcom that aired on NBC from April 24, 1978 to May 10, 1978.

Premise
The series features the exploits of a fictional all-female roller derby team, the Pittsburgh Pitts, owned and managed by Don Mitchell (Terry Kiser).

Cast
 Terry Kiser as Don Mitchell
 Rhonda Bates as Mongo Sue Lambert
 Candy Ann Brown J.B Johnson
 Joanna Cassidy as Selma 'Books' Cassidy
 Marcy Hanson as Honey Bee Novak
 Marilyn Tokuda as Shana 'Pipeline' Akira
 James Murtaugh as Howie Devine

Episodes

References

External links
 

1978 American television series debuts
1978 American television series endings
1970s American sitcoms
NBC original programming
Television shows set in Pittsburgh
Roller derby mass media